Mas-related G-protein coupled receptor member X4 is a protein that in humans is encoded by the MRGPRX4 gene.

See also
 MAS1 oncogene

References

Further reading

G protein-coupled receptors